Public holidays in Saudi Arabia ( Arabic: العطل الرسمية في السعودية ) In Saudi Arabia there are few holidays, compared with other countries in the Gulf Cooperation Council, but they have long-term holidays from 10 to 12 days. Where the expense of public holidays in Saudi Arabia only as days of work, in addition to the daily Friday and Saturday weekend, amounting to vacations up to more than two weeks.

Government departments and institutions are suspended in the Kingdom of Saudi Arabia during the festival holidays for holiday Eid al-Fitr and Eid al-Adha to the public sector if there is a time and one day the reality of the weekend and the Eid holiday, this day is added to the Eid vacation.

Calendar
Saudi Arabia follows the Islamic calendar, which consists of 12 months but only 354 or 355 days.

Working time and official holidays
Working hours begin at 8:00 AM and end at 2:00 PM for government departments. Businesses operate Sunday - Thursday and some businesses operate on Saturday as well. The operation hours are in the morning from 10:00 AM–12:00 PM and in the afternoon from 4:00 PM–10:00 PM but close shortly during prayer time. School hours are from 7:30 AM – 1:00 PM.

References

Saudi Arabia
Saudi Arabian culture
Holidays
Saudi Arabia